Kariņš cabinet could refer to one of the following governments in Latvia:
 First Kariņš cabinet (2019–2022)
 Second Kariņš cabinet (2022–)